"You're the Best Thing That Ever Happened To Me" — also known simply as "Best Thing That Ever Happened To Me" — is a song written by Jim Weatherly, and produced by Don Law. It was first recorded in 1973 by Ray Price from his album You're the Best Thing That Ever Happened To Me. The song enjoyed two runs of popularity, each by an artist in a different genre.

Weatherly told Tom Roland in The Billboard Book of Number One Country Hits that he wrote the song in 1971 and let his father-in-law first record it as a Christmas present for the latter's wife. "I thought it was really strange that nobody'd written a song with that title — possibly somebody had, but I'd never heard it — so I just sat down and let this stream of consciousness happen. I basically wrote it in a very short period of time, probably 30 minutes or an hour."

The versions

Ray Price country version
The song's first run of popularity, as "You're the Best Thing That Ever Happened to Me," came in 1973, when country music singer Ray Price took the song to number 1 on the Billboard Hot Country Singles chart on October 6, 1973.

For that version, it represented a last and a first. The "last" was Price's seventh and most recent No. 1 single, in a string dating back to his 1956 hit "Crazy Arms." The "first": It was the No. 1 single on the debut program of American Country Countdown, which used the Billboard chart in its programming. Although it fell short of the top 40 in his native United States, the song was an easy listening hit in Canada, his third such hit there.

Gladys Knight & the Pips pop/R&B version
In the early- to mid-1970s, Gladys Knight & the Pips recorded several of Weatherly's songs, and in 1974, they dipped into his catalog once again with their rendition of the song. Their version, titled "Best Thing That Ever Happened to Me," reached number 3 on the Billboard Hot 100 that spring and topped the Hot Soul Singles for two weeks. The single was certified gold by the RIAA for sales of one million copies. It also reached the top 10 in the United Kingdom.

James Cleveland gospel version
In 1975, legendary gospel singer Rev. James Cleveland & The Charles Fold Singers recorded a live version of the song, which was cited (in the song) as an adaptation of the Gladys Knight & The Pips version of the song.

Chart history

Weekly charts

Year-end charts

The Persuaders R&B version
In 1974, The Persuaders also recorded a version, taken from their album of the same name Their version was quieter, less brassy, and more introspective than The Pips' version The song reached number 85 on the Billboard Hot 100 chart.

Dean Martin pop version
The song was also recorded by Dean Martin in 1973.

Andy Williams version
Andy Williams released a version in 1974 on his album, The Way We Were.

Steve Lawrence version
Steve Lawrence released a version in 1973 under MGM Records label.

Chart performance

Ray Price version

References

External links
 

1973 singles
1974 singles
Ray Price (musician) songs
Songs written by Jim Weatherly
Gladys Knight & the Pips songs
The Persuaders (R&B group) songs
Andy Williams songs
1973 songs
Buddah Records singles
Columbia Nashville Records singles
Song recordings produced by Don Law